César David Texeira Torres (born 27 February 1991) is a Uruguayan professional footballer who plays as a forward.

Club career

Defensor Sporting
Texeira started his career playing with Defensor Sporting a top club in Uruguay, where he made his debut in the first team against Rampla Juniors on 30 February 2010.

FC Groningen
In August 2011, he was transferred to FC Groningen. He made his Eredivisie debut on 11 September 2011 against SC Heerenveen, and scored his first goal with the new club against AZ in the 2010–11 KNVB Cup. During the January transfer window, Texeira was heavily linked with a move to Liverpool, which would have seen him join up with national teammates Sebastián Coates and Luis Suárez. These rumours turned out to be false and Texeira stayed at Groningen. In the 2012–13 season, he played in midfield and ended the season with 29 appearances and five goals.

FC Dallas
Texeira was acquired by FC Dallas of Major League Soccer on 21 February 2014. He joined as a Designated Player, on an undisclosed contract. He made his debut on 16 March in a 1–1 draw at Sporting Kansas City, replacing Mauro Díaz for the last 12 minutes; he won the free kick that led to his team's late equaliser. In his first season, he scored four times as the team reached the Western Conference semi-finals, including two in a 3–1 home win against Seattle Sounders FC on 24 September.

In his second season, Texeira scored in home and away wins over the Houston Dynamo in the Texas derby, including two on 4 October 2015 in a 4–1 win at the Toyota Stadium. The team lost the Conference final to the Portland Timbers, with Texeira scoring once in the 5–3 aggregate loss.

Return to Europe
In January 2016, Texeira returned to European football by joining Sivasspor of the Turkish Süper Lig. Unemployed during the summer, he signed for Vitória S.C. of Portugal's Primeira Liga on 10 September. He was a 57th-minute substitute for Ghislain Konan in the 2017 Taça de Portugal Final, a 2–1 loss to S.L. Benfica.

After 25 games and six total goals for the team from Guimarães, Texeira was allowed to leave by manager Pedro Martins in January 2018 and headed for AEL Limassol in the Cypriot First Division. On 26 July that year he returned to the city, signing a two-year deal with Moreirense F.C. including the option of a third.

Return to the United States
On 24 September 2021, Texeira returned to the United States, joining third-tier USL League One side Chattanooga Red Wolves.

International career
He has been capped by the Uruguay national under-20 football team for the 2011 FIFA U-20 World Cup.

Career statistics

Club

International goals

|- bgcolor=#DFE7FF
| 1. || 7 July 2011 || Estádio Brinco de Ouro da Princesa, Campinas, Brazil ||  || 2–0 || 3–0 || Friendly
|- bgcolor=#DFE7FF
| 2. || 11 July 2011 || Complejo Uruguay Celeste, Canelones, Uruguay ||  || 3–0 || 7–0 || Friendly
|- bgcolor=#DFE7FF
| 3. || 13 July 2011 || Estadio Juan Antonio Lavalleja, Flores, Uruguay ||  || 1–0 || 2–0 || Friendly
|}

References

External links

1991 births
Living people
Uruguayan footballers
Uruguay under-20 international footballers
Defensor Sporting players
FC Groningen players
FC Dallas players
Sivasspor footballers
Vitória S.C. players
AEL Limassol players
Moreirense F.C. players
Chattanooga Red Wolves SC players
Uruguayan Primera División players
Eredivisie players
Major League Soccer players
Süper Lig players
Primeira Liga players
Cypriot First Division players
USL League One players
Uruguayan expatriate footballers
Expatriate footballers in the Netherlands
Expatriate soccer players in the United States
Expatriate footballers in Turkey
Expatriate footballers in Portugal
Expatriate footballers in Cyprus
Uruguayan expatriate sportspeople in the Netherlands
Designated Players (MLS)
Association football forwards
Footballers from Salto, Uruguay